McDonald's is a  restaurant that spans the Will Rogers Turnpike section of Interstate 44 (I-44) near Vinita, Oklahoma. It is notable as the first bridge restaurant in the world and as an example of a U.S. roadside restaurant. It was the world's largest McDonald's before the current largest McDonald's in the world located in Orlando, Florida was built.

It shares the space with a Phillips 66 gas station. 

The building and service plaza closed on June 4, 2013, for a $14.6 million renovation. At its grand reopening on December 22, 2014, it was renamed from "Glass House Restaurant" to "Will Rogers Archway".

At the front of the west anchor stands a statue of Will Rogers. The restaurant contains a small Will Rogers museum.

Gallery

References

McDonald's buildings and structures
Buildings and structures in Craig County, Oklahoma
Restaurants in Oklahoma
Landmarks in Oklahoma
Rest areas in the United States
Restaurants established in 1957
1957 establishments in Oklahoma